Susan M. Gasser (born 1955) is a Swiss molecular biologist. From 2004 - 2019 she was the Director of the Friedrich Miescher Institute for Biomedical Research in Basel, Switzerland, where she also led a research group from 2004 until 2021. She was in parallel Professor of  molecular biology  at the  University of Basel until April 2021. Since January 2021, Susan Gasser is Director of the ISREC Foundation, which supports translational cancer research. She is also Professor invité at the University of Lausanne in the Department of Fundamental Microbiology. She is an expert in quantitative biology and studies epigenetic inheritance and genome stability.  Recipient of multiple swiss and European awards, she was named member of the US Academy of Sciences in 2022.

Early career
Susan Gasser received her doctorate from the University of Basel in Biochemistry in 1982 at the Biozentrum of the University of Basel, after a BA at the University of Chicago with a Honors thesis in Biophysics (1979). For her PhD she developed an in vitro system for the import of mitochondrial proteins, demonstrating its energy-dependence and identifying compartment-specific processing pathways for protein import, advised by Gottfried (Jeff) Schatz. As a post-doctoral fellow at the University of Geneva with Ulrich K. Laemmli, she established roles for topoisomerase II in metaphase chromosome structure (Gasser et al., JMB 1986) and for A/T-rich sequences in long-range chromatin folding (Gasser and Laemmli, Cell 1986). She established her own laboratory at the ISREC Swiss Institute for Experimental Cancer Research in Epalinges in 1986.

Career
Gasser led a research group at the Swiss Institute for Experimental Cancer Research in Epalinges sur Lausanne until 2001. There she pioneered live fluorescence imaging of telomeres and repressed chromatin in budding yeast, coupled with biochemical and genetic approaches to understand chromosome structure and nuclear organization. She was named professor of Molecular Biology at the University of Geneva in 2001, prior to moving to lead the Friedrich Miescher Institute for Biomedical Research in Basel, as its Director, in 2004. At the FMI she led a research group studying the spatial organization of double-strand break repair and checkpoint activation in budding yeast, and established and exploited means to study the spatial organization and genetic control of heterochromatin in C. elegans. From 2005 - 2021 she also held the position of full professor at the University of Basel. Since February 2021, she is the Director of the ISREC Foundation, which built and maintains the new Agora institute of translational cancer research in Lausanne, Switzerland. Susan Gasser also holds the position of Guest professor at the University of Lausanne.

Initially studying chromatin organization in budding yeast, her laboratory combined genetic, biochemical and fluorescence microscopy approaches, developing quantitative live imaging tools to study the subnuclear dynamics of DNA loci in living cells. Her work elucidated roles of histone modifications and turnover in genome stability and in the spatial organization of chromatin in the interphase nucleus, with an emphasis on the function of subnuclear compartments both in yeast, and in C. elegans during tissue differentiation. 
 
Gasser has served on review boards and advisory councils throughout Switzerland, Europe. and Japan, and is currently Chair of the Strategic Advisory Board of the Helmholtz Society Health Program of Germany. She serves on the ETH Board (Rat der Eidgenossosichen Technischen Hochschulen) and the Swiss Science Council. She served on the Gairdner Foundation Medical Prize committee, the EMBL Science Advisory Council (SAC), and numerous Foundation boards in Switzerland. She was vice chairperson and then Chairperson of the EMBO Council (2000-2004) and a member of the President's Science and Technology Advisory Council (PSTAC; 2012-2014) for the European Commission. Susan led the Gender Committee of the Swiss National Science Foundation from 2014- 2019, and initiated the PRIMA program for the promotion of women in academia, actively promoting the careers of women scientists in Switzerland. In Japan, she co-founded the Women in Science Japan organization. Susan Gasser was elected to the National Academy of Science (US), the Académie de France, Leopoldina, EMBO, AAAS, as well as the Swiss Academy of Medical Sciences, and received the INSERM International Prize in 2011, the FEBS | EMBO Women in Science Award in 2012, the Weizmann Institute Women in Science award, the Otto Naegeli prize in medical research (2006). She holds honorary doctorates from the University of Lausanne, the University of Fribourg, the University of Geneva and the Charles University in Prague. In Switzerland she was also recipient of the Friedrich Miescher Award (1991(the National Latsis Prize (1992), the Otto Naegeli Prize in Medical Sciences (2006) and the Lelio Orci Award (2023). 

She has published over 300 articles and reviews in leading journals (see Google Scholar entry) and serves on editorial boards of Molecular Cell, Genes & Development among other journals.

Career history

 1977-1979: University of Chicago, Illinois, United States, Bachelor of Arts with honours in biophysics
 1979-1982: University of Basel (Biozentrum) PhD Magna cum laude in biochemistry, thesis advisor: Prof. G. Schatz
 1983-1986: maître assistant, Prof. U. K. Laemmli, University of Geneva, Department of Molecular Biology
 1986-1990: junior group leader, Swiss Institute for Experimental Cancer Research
 1991-2001: senior group leader, Swiss Institute for Experimental Cancer Research
 2001-2004: full professor, Department of Molecular Biology, University of Geneva, Geneva
 2004-2019: Director of the Friedrich Miescher Institute for Biomedical Research, Basel
 2005-2021: full professor in molecular biology, University of Basel
 2021–present: Director of the ISREC Foundation, Lausanne and guest professor in fundamental microbiology, University of Lausanne, Switzerland

External appointments (selected)
1993-2002	Member, Research Council of the Swiss National Science Foundation, Bern 	
2000-2009	Member, Selection Committee, SNF Career Professorship Program, Bern
2002-2003  Member, Selection Jury, Institut Universitaire de France (IUF), Paris	
2000-2005	Member, Vice-chair and Chair of the EMBO Council, Heidelberg, Germany	
2004-2007	Member, Search Committee, Körber-Foundation, Hamburg	
2006-2016	Board of Directors, Gebert Rüf Foundation, Basel 		
2005-2010	Advisory Board Cancer Research UK, London Research Institutes, London 	
2006-2012	Advisory Group on Health Research FP7, European Commission, Brussels	
2006-2008	advisory board, Max Planck Institute for Dev. Biology, Tübingen	
2006-2011	advisory board, Center for Integrative Genomics, Lausanne	
2007-2015	advisory board for Wellcome Trust Centre for Research, Dundee, Scotland 	
2007-2014	advisory board for Max Planck Institute for Immunology, Freiburg	
2008-2018	Member of the Nestlé Nutrition Council, Nestlé SA, Vevey, Switzerland	
2012-2017	Member, Wissenschafliches Beirat of the Institute of Advanced Study, Berlin	
2016-now 	Member, Crick Institute Review Board, Scientific Advisory Board, London	2012, 
2012-2016	advisory board for Max Planck Institut for Biophysical Chemistry, Göttingen, German	
2013-2014	President's Science and Technology Advisory Council (STAC) of the European Commission	
2012-2015	Selection committee for the Royal Netherlands Academy of Arts and Science Prize	
2003-2018	Member, Human Frontiers Science Organization Grant Review and Career Development Committees, Strasbourg
2014-2018	Member, Executive Board, Genomics Institute of the Novartis Research Foundation	
2014-2020	Chairwoman, Gender Commission of the Swiss National Science Foundation, Bern	
2015-2022	Member, Scientific Advisory Council, European Molecular Biology Laboratories, Heidelberg, Germany
since 2017 Member, Scientific Advisory Board, University of Tokyo Institute of Quantitative Biology, Tokyo, Japan	
2015-2022	Member, Gairdner Prize Award committee, Toronto, Canada	
since 2016	Member, Swiss Wissenschaftsrat (Swiss Science Council, SSC), Bern	
since 2018	Member, ETH Board (Governing Board of the ETH Domain), Switzerland	
2019-2027	Chair, Strategic Board of the Helmholtz Society Health Program, Germany	
2019	Chair, Review Board of the Systems Biology Department, Weizmann Inst. Rehovot, Israel	
since 2020	Member, Scientific Advisory Board, Biozentrum der Universität Basel	
2020-2022	Board of Trustees, Institute of Science and Technology Austria (ISTA), Austria		
since 2020	Chair, International Review Panel for ONCODE network, NL	
since 2021	Review Board VIB, then Scientific Advisory Board member, Belgium	
since 2021	Board of Directors, UCB, Brussels, Belgium

Awards
 2022 Honorary Doctorate, University of Geneva, Switzerland
 2022 Elected international member of the National Academy of Sciences USA
 2021 Honorary Doctorate, University of Fribourg, Switzerland
 2016 Honorary Doctorate, Charles University, Prague, Czech Republic
 2016 Lee Hartwell Award of the Genetics Society of America
 2014 Doctorat Honoris causa, University of Lausanne
 2013 Member of the EC Presidents Science and Technology advisory Council (PSTAC)
 2013 Weizmann Institute, Women in Science Award
 2012 FEBS/EMBO Women in Science Award
 2011 Prix International de l'INSERM, France
 2009 Election to American Association for the Advancement of Science
 2009 London Royal Society of Chemistry "Nucleic Acid" Award
 2007 Election to German Academy of Science, Leopoldina
 2006 Election to Academy of Medical Sciences, Switzerland
 2006 Gregor Mendel Medal, Czech Academy of Science
 2006 Otto Naegeli Prize for Biomedical Research, Switzerland
 2005 Foreign member, Académie des Sciences, Institut de France
 1999 Medal of Honor, 3rd Medical Faculty of Charles University, Prague
 1998 Election to Academia Europaea
 1994 Friedrich Miescher Prize, Swiss Society for Biochemistry
 1993 Member, EMBO
 1991 National Latsis Prize, Swiss National Science Foundation

Selected publications
 2020 The LSM2-8 complex and XRN-2 mediate RNA decay at H3K27me3-marked genes in C. elegans. Nature Cell Biology, doi: 10.1038/s41556-020-0504-1 Mattout A, Gaidatzis D, Padeken J, Schmid CD, Aeschlimann F, Kalck V and Gasser SM 
 2019 Active chromatin marks drive spatial sequestration of heterochromatin in differentiated cells. Nature 569, 734 - 739. doi: 10.1038/s41586-019-1243-y Cabianca D, Munoz Jimenez C, Kalck V, Gaidatzis D, Padeken J, Askjaer P and Gasser SM 
 2017 Histone degradation in response to DNA damage enhances chromatin dynamics and recombination rates. Nature Struct. Mol. Biology, 24, 99 – 107.  doi: 10.1038/nsmb.3347v Hauer MH, Seeber A, Singh V, Thierry R, Sack R, Amitai A, Kryzhanovska M, Eglinger J, Holcman D, Owen-Hughes T and Gasser SM 
 2016 Histone H3K9 methylation is dispensable for C. elegans development, but suppresses RNA-DNA hybrid-associated repeat instability. Nature Genetics, 48, 1385 - 1395. doi: 10.1038/ng.3672 Zeller P, Padeken J, van Schendel R, Kalck V, Tijsterman M and Gasser SM 
 2015 Perinuclear Anchoring of H3K9-Methylated Chromatin Stabilizes Induced Cell Fate in C. elegans embryos. Cell, 163, 1333 – 1347 Gonzalez-Sandoval A, Towbin BD, Kalck V, Cabianca DS, Gaidatzis D, Hauer MH, Geng L, Wang L, Yang T, Wang X, Zhao K and Gasser SM 
 2013 TORC2 signaling pathway guarantees genome stability in face of DNA strand breaks. Mol Cell, 51:829-839, Shimada K, Fillipuzzi I, Stahl M, Helliwell SB, Seeber A, Loewith R, Movva R, Gasser SM
 2013 The shelterin protein POT-1 anchors C. elegans telomeres through SUN-1 at the nuclear periphery. J Cell Biol, 203:727-35, Ferreira HC, Towbin BD, Jegou T, Gasser SM
 2013 Checkpoint kinases and nucleosome remodelers enhance global chromatin mobility in response to DNA damage. Genes Dev, 27:1999-2008. doi:10.1101/gad.222992.113, Seeber A, Dion V, Gasser SM 
 2013 Cohesin and the nucleolus constrain the mobility of spontaneous repair foci. EMBO Rep. 14:984-991, Dion V, Kalck V, Seeber A, Schleker T, Gasser SM
 2013 SIR proteins and the assembly of silent chromatin in budding yeast. Annu Rev Genet. 47:275-306, Kueng S, Oppikofer M, Gasser SM 
 2012 Step-wise methylation of histone H3K9 positions chromosome arms at the nuclear periphery in C. elegans embryos. Cell, 150:934-947, Towbin BD, Gonzalez-Aguilera C, Sack R, Gaidatzis D, Kalck V, Meister P, Askjaer P, Gasser SM 
 2012 Increased dynamics of double strand breaks requires Mec1, Rad9 and the homologous recombination machinery. Nat. Cell Biol. 14:502-509, Dion V, Kalck V, Horigome C, Towbin BD, Gasser SM
 2012 Targeted INO80 enhances subnuclear chromatin movement and ectopic homologous recombination. Genes Dev 26:369-38 Neumann FR, Dion V, Gehlen L, Tsai-Pflugfelder M, Schmid R, Taddei A, Gasser SM
 2008  Functional Targeting of DNA Damage to a Nuclear Pore-associated SUMO-dependent Ubiquitin ligase. Science, 322, 597 - 602 Nagai S, Dubrana K, Tsai-Pflugfelder M, Davidson MB, Roberts TM, Brown GW, Varela E, Hediger F, Gasser SM* and Krogan NJ 
 2005 Automatic tracking of individual fluorescence particles - Application to the study of chromosome dynamics. IEEE Transactions on Image Processing, 14, 1372 – 1383 Sage D, Neumann FR, Hediger F, Gasser SM and Unser M 
 2004 INO80 recruitment by H2A phosphorylation links ATP-dependent chromatin remodeling with DNA double-strand break repair. Cell, 119, 777 – 788 van Attikum H, Fritsch O, Hohn B and Gasser SM

Notes and references

External links
Research Europe
Gasser's Lab

Swiss biologists
Molecular biologists
Swiss medical researchers
Living people
Swiss women scientists
Women biologists
Women medical researchers
Academic staff of the University of Basel
University of Basel alumni
20th-century Swiss scientists
21st-century Swiss scientists
20th-century biologists
21st-century biologists
20th-century women scientists
21st-century women scientists
1955 births